Slobodan Samardžić is a Serbian academic and politician who served as the Minister for Kosovo and Metohija from 2007 to 2008.

Early years and education
Samardžić was born in Belgrade in 1953 to Bosnian Serb and Montenegrin Serb parents. He belongs to a prominent Montenegrin Samardžić family that originates from the Herzegovinian Krivošije region and clan near Herceg Novi, in Montenegro.

Samardžić graduated from the University of Belgrade Faculty of Political Sciences, where he also obtained his PhD.

Professional career
He was editor of scientific and political program at Radio Belgrade from 1982 to 1984. He was a fellow of the Institute of European Studies. Since 2001, Samardžić is a full professor of European Studies at the Faculty of Political Sciences of the University of Belgrade. He is also Director of Political Studies at the Belgrade think-tank Centre for Liberal-Democratic Studies.

Area of his studies includes political ideas and institutions, contemporary federalism, political theory and practice of constitutionalism, political system of Yugoslavia and Serbia, and European Union. 

Samardžić has written six books: Ideology and Rationalism (1984), Council Democracy (1987), Yugoslavia and the Challenge of Federalism (1990), Coercive Community and Democracy (1994), European Union as a Model of the Supranational Community (1998), and State Construction and Deconstruction (2008).

Samardžić was advisor for political issues to former Yugoslav president and Serbian Prime Minister Vojislav Koštunica. He headed the Serbian government’s Committee for Decentralisation and was (with Vuk Jeremić) co-ordinator of Serbia's State Negotiating Team on the future status of Kosovo-Metohija.

Personal life
Samardžić speaks English and German. He is married and has three children.

Media
Slobodan Samardžić appears in Boris Malagurski's documentary film The Weight of Chains in which he talks about the motives behind Western intervention in the Kosovo War. In the film, Samardžić also speaks about concerns regarding the status of Serbia's northern province of Vojvodina.

References

External links

 Articles about Samardzic in 'Mail & Guardian'  
 Slobodan Samardzic: Serbia insists that UNMIK remains in the province
 Samardzic: Kosovo constitution unacceptable to Serbia  

1953 births
Living people
Politicians from Belgrade
Democratic Party of Serbia politicians
Serbian political scientists
Academic staff of the University of Belgrade
Eastern Orthodox Christians from Serbia
Serbian people of Montenegrin descent